The San Juan River is the largest and most important river in the Mexican state of  Nuevo León. The river feeds the El Cuchillo Dam, which provides the city of Monterrey with water. The San Juan River is a tributary to the Rio Grande (Rio Bravo) — which is the fourth largest river basin in North America. It begins in Coahuila, flows through Nuevo León and into Tamaulipas, where it finally joins the Rio Grande near Camargo, Tamaulipas.

See also
 List of rivers of Mexico
 List of tributaries of the Rio Grande
 San Juan River (Colorado River)

References

Tributaries of the Rio Grande
Rivers of Coahuila
Rivers of Nuevo León
Rivers of Tamaulipas
Freshwater ecoregions